Robert B. Charles (born 1960) is an American lawyer and Republican political figure. He was assistant secretary of state at the U.S. State Department's Bureau of International Narcotics and Law Enforcement Affairs from 2003 to 2005.  He served under Secretary of State Colin Powell.

Early life and education
Charles grew up in a small town in Maine.

He received a J.D. from Columbia Law School in New York, M.A. in Philosophy, Politics, and Economics (PPE) from Oxford University in England, and A.B. from Dartmouth College in New Hampshire.

Career 
Charles began his career as a law clerk to Judge Robert R. Beezer of the U.S. Court of Appeals for the Ninth Circuit from 1987 to 1988. He worked as a litigator in New York and Washington, at Weil Gotshal & Manges and Kramer Levin between 1988 and 1994. From 1992 through early 1993, he worked in the George H. W. Bush White House as a Deputy Associate Director, Office of Domestic Policy.  Ten years earlier, he had served as a temporary appointee in the first-term Reagan White House during 1981–1983.

From 1995 through late 1999, Charles was served as Staff Director and Chief Counsel for the Subcommittee on National Security, International Affairs, and Criminal Justice of the House Committee on Government Reform and Oversight under chairmen Bill Zeliff, Dennis Hastert and John Mica. He was also senior staffer to the Speaker's Task Force on a Drug-Free America and U.S. House Bi-Partisan Drug Policy Group during this period.

From 1998 through 2000, he taught courses at Harvard University's Extension School.

From 1998 through 2009, Charles was Naval Intelligence Officer (USNR) at the Office of Naval Intelligence (ONI) and in the Pentagon, with the Chief of Naval Intelligence - Intelligence Plot  (CNO-IP).

From October 4, 2003 to March 15, 2005, Charles was Assistant Secretary of State for International Narcotics and Law Enforcement Affairs (INL), under Secretaries of State Colin Powell and Condoleezza Rice.

Charles is currently the President and Managing Member of The Charles Group, LLC, a Washington, DC-based consulting firm.

His management style was detailed in State of War: The Secret History of the CIA and the Bush Administration, Seeds of Terror, and The New York Times.

Member of the Council on Foreign Relations (CFR).

Published works
Charles has produced dozens of articles and columns, as well as book chapters, law review articles, and the book Narcotics and Terrorism, a 2004 volume explaining national and homeland security implications tied to drug trafficking. He has also appeared on a variety of media, including C-SPAN, 60 Minutes, cable and as a Fox News Opinion Contributor.

His latest book, Eagles and Evergreens (North Country Press, 2018), contains 45 stories on growing up in rural Maine under the influence of WWII veterans, celebrating non-artisan values they passed along. Eagles and Evergreens got endorsed by The Washington Post, former Secretary of Defense William Cohen, former Senate Majority Leader George Mitchell, Apollo 11 astronaut and Korean War veteran Buzz Aldrin, and the Chief Speechwriter for Ronald Reagan, Tony Dolan, as well  as others.

References

1960 births
Living people
United States Department of State officials
Dartmouth College alumni
Alumni of the University of Oxford
Columbia Law School alumni